Fred Koller (born March 5, 1950 in Chicago) is an American singer-songwriter. He has been active in the music business since 1973. Fred lives and works in Nashville with his wife Trish and their cat Buddy.

Music career

Koller has written over 300 songs which have been recorded. He was awarded the BMI Millionaire Performance Award for both "Angel Eyes" and "She Came from Fort Worth". Koller also won BMI Awards for "This Dream's On Me", "Goin' Gone", "Life As We Knew It" and "Will It Be Love By Morning". He is the former Vice President of The Nashville Songwriters Association International. Koller has taught for Songwriters Guild of America and was a staff instructor for both the Kerrville Folk Festival and the Augusta Heritage Festival.

Books and bookselling

Koller opened his first bookstore in Capitola, California in 1975. It was located a few blocks from the ocean on Bay Ave. and was called Words and Music. The shop stocked an eclectic collection of used records, books and sheet music. After two years the store moved to an old fisherman's cottage where Fred and his first wife, majolica artist Farraday Newsome, lived upstairs.

In 1979 Fred sold his bookstore and moved back to Nashville, Tennessee. He opened Rhino Booksellers in Nashville in Oct. 2001. There are presently two locations.

Koller is the author of How to Pitch and Promote Your Songs which is in its third edition. He also contributed to The Homespun Songwriter's Workshop and taught Homespun Tapes: Developing Your Lyrics.

Fred and Shel

Children's author Shel Silverstein was spending a lot of time on his houseboat in Sausalito, California and would often visit to write songs and explore Santa Cruz, California.

In 1974, Silverstein and Koller began writing their first song together. Silverstein was already famous for his Playboy cartoons, children's books and several songwriting hits for artists like Doctor Hook and Johnny Cash. Their collaboration grew into a friendship that would last for the next 25 years.

On one two-week trip together to Santa Cruz, California  they wrote a dozen songs like "Don’t Knock The Music (You Were Made To)" and "Lovely Margarita," which features a transvestite strip tease artist unveiling the "secrets of an ancient world's delight." Other encounters produced "Little Green Buttons," which introduces listeners to a woman saving a dying marriage with carefully placed tattoos, and "The Happy Caucasian," which chronicles a modern-day Johnny Appleseed who spreads joy and jubilation all across the nation while "singing out good news." Country singer Bobby Bare recorded a version of "This Guitar Is for Sale," and Robert Earl Keen, Conway Twitty and Bare have all recorded versions of the first song Koller and Silverstein wrote together, "Jennifer Johnson and Me".  A few more were recorded on Fred's "Night of The Living Fred" release.

Discography

 Night of the Living Fred, Alcazar (1989)
 Songs From the Night Before, Alcazar (1994)
 Where the Fast Lane Ends, Alcazar (1994)
 Sweet Baby Fred, Appaloosa (1998)
 No Song Left To Sell, Gadfly (2001)
 12 Original Songs Live From Norm's River Road House, Lucrative Music (2012)

Songwriting credits

References

External links 
 Fred Koller's Official Website
 Country Music Television listing
 Direct Listing

1950 births
Living people
American male singer-songwriters
Singers from Chicago
People from Nashville, Tennessee
Singer-songwriters from Tennessee
People from Capitola, California
Singer-songwriters from Illinois
Singer-songwriters from California